Eckard Rabe is a former South African film, television and theatre actor. He is now a teacher at Parktown Boys' High School. He was born in 1948 in St Winifreds, Natal and grew up in Port Shepstone. He acted as the business tycoon and patriarch of the Edwards family on the local soap opera, Egoli - Place of Gold from 1995 to 2009. Eckard is married to Debbie Taylor.  He has one daughter, Caitlin Biance, by actress Jo Da Silva.

Filmography
 Ballade vir 'n Enkeling (2015)
 Getroud met Rugby: Die Onvertelde Storie (2011)
 Catch a Fire (2006)
 Act of Piracy (1990)
 American Ninja 3: Blood Hunt (1989)
 Paradise Road (1988)
 Kampus: 'n Varsity-Storie (1986)
 Plekkie in die son (1979)
 Springbok (1976)
 Daar Kom Tant Alie (1976)
 Dog Squad (1973)

Television
 7de Laan (2010)
 Wild at Heart (2010)
 Egoli: Place of Gold (1995–2009)
 Westgate (1981)
 The Dingleys (1977)

Teacher
Eckard Rabe is now an English teacher at Parktown Boys' High School

External links

 Mr Eckard Rabe-Who's Who of Southern Africa

1948 births
Living people
People from Port Shepstone
South African male actors